Peptidylprolyl isomerase A (PPIA), also known as cyclophilin A (CypA) or rotamase A is an enzyme that in humans is encoded by the PPIA gene on chromosome 7. As a member of the peptidyl-prolyl cis-trans isomerase (PPIase) family, this protein catalyzes the cis-trans isomerization of proline imidic peptide bonds, which allows it to regulate many biological processes, including intracellular signaling, transcription, inflammation, and apoptosis.  Due to its various functions, PPIA has been implicated in a broad range of inflammatory diseases, including atherosclerosis and arthritis, and viral infections.

Structure

PPIA is an 18 kDa, 165-amino acid long cytosolic protein. Like other cyclophilins, PPIA forms a β-barrel structure with a hydrophobic core. This β-barrel is composed of eight anti-parallel β-strands and capped by two α-helices at the top and bottom. In addition, the β-turns and loops in the strands contribute to the flexibility of the barrel. Its active site is a hydrophobic pocket that binds peptides containing proline. Cyclosporine can bind this pocket to inhibit the protein’s enzymatic activity.

Function 

This gene encodes a member of the peptidyl-prolyl cis-trans isomerase (PPIase) family. PPIases catalyze the cis-trans isomerization of proline imidic peptide bonds in oligopeptides and accelerate protein folding. Generally, PPIases are found in all eubacteria and eukaryotes, as well as in a few archaebacteria, and thus are highly conserved. Of the 18 known human cyclophilins, PPIA is the most abundantly expressed isozyme. In particular, PPIA is predominantly expressed in the nucleus and cytoplasm of the cell, where it partakes in intracellular signaling, protein transport, and transcription regulation. In hemopoietic cells, subcellular localization of PPIA from the nucleus to the cytoplasm has been observed during c-Jun N-terminal kinase- and serine protease-dependent microtubule disruption. This localization has been correlated with G2/M arrest, indicating that the protein's PPIase function may be regulated by microtubule dynamics during the cell cycle. PPIA has also been associated with the mitochondria.

Moreover, the enzyme participates in inflammatory and apoptotic processes in extracellular settings. In the presence of reactive oxygen species (ROS), vascular smooth muscle cells (VSMCs), monocytes/macrophages, and endothelial cells (ECs) secrete PPIA to induce an inflammatory response and mitigate tissue injury. PPIA may also activate Akt and NF-κB signaling, resulting in the upregulation of Bcl-2, an antiapoptotic protein, and thus preventing apoptosis in ECs in response to oxidative stress. PPIA may also regulate ERK1/2, JNK, p38 kinase, Akt, and IκB signalling pathways through activating the CD147 receptor. PPIA-mediated activation of the ERK, JNK, and p38 kinase pathways also contributes to angiogenesis. Additionally, PPIA induces cell migration and proliferation in smooth muscle. In the case of T cells, PPIA regulates the T-cell-specific tyrosine kinase ITK upon T-cell receptor stimulation.

Clinical significance 

The PPIA protein is an important apoptotic constituent. During a normal embryologic processes, or during cell injury (such as ischemia-reperfusion injury during heart attacks and strokes) or during developments and processes in cancer, an apoptotic cell undergoes structural changes including cell shrinkage, plasma membrane blebbing, nuclear condensation, and fragmentation of the DNA and nucleus. This is followed by fragmentation into apoptotic bodies that are quickly removed by phagocytes, thereby preventing an inflammatory response. It is a mode of cell death defined by characteristic morphological, biochemical and molecular changes. It was first described as a "shrinkage necrosis", and then this term was replaced by apoptosis to emphasize its role opposite mitosis in tissue kinetics. In later stages of apoptosis the entire cell becomes fragmented, forming a number of plasma membrane-bounded apoptotic bodies which contain nuclear and or cytoplasmic elements. The ultrastructural appearance of necrosis is quite different, the main features being mitochondrial swelling, plasma membrane breakdown and cellular disintegration. Apoptosis occurs in many physiological and pathological processes. It plays an important role during embryonal development as programmed cell death and accompanies a variety of normal involutional processes in which it serves as a mechanism to remove "unwanted" cells.

As a proinflammatory cytokine, PPIA is highly involved in acute and chronic inflammatory diseases, including sepsis, atherosclerosis, and rheumatoid arthritis. Thus, therapeutic targeting of PPIA with selective inhibitors may prove effective in combatting such inflammatory diseases and symptoms. Correlation between plasma PPIA levels and hyperglycemia symptoms also promotes utilization of PPIA as a biomarker for diabetes and vascular disease.

Furthermore, PPIA is involved in cerebral hypoxia-ischemia by contributing to the nuclear transport of AIF, a proapoptotic factor, in neurons. To maintain the integrity of the blood brain barrier and mitigate brain injury, PPIA helps to recruit circulating monocytes and stimulates survival and growth pathways. In cardiac myogenic cells, cyclophilins have been observed to be activated by heat shock and hypoxia-reoxygenation as well as complex with heat shock proteins. Thus, cyclophilins may function in cardioprotection during ischemia-reperfusion injury.

Currently, PPIA expression is highly correlated with cancer pathogenesis, but the specific mechanisms remain to be elucidated. PPIA overexpression has been associated with hepatocellular carcinoma, lung cancer, pancreatic adenocarcinoma, endometrial carcinoma, esophageal squamous cell carcinoma, and melanoma.

The protein can also interact with several HIV proteins, including p55 gag, Vpr, and capsid protein, and has been shown to be necessary for the formation of infectious HIV virions. As a result, PPIA contributes to viral diseases such as AIDS, hepatitis C, measles, and influenza A.

Interactions 

Peptidylprolyl isomerase A has been shown to interact with: 
 ITK,
 CD147,
 P53,
 STAT3,

See also 

 Cyclophilin
 TRIM5alpha

References

Further reading